Akashi Park Stadium is a track and field and association football stadium located in Akashi Park, in Akashi, Hyōgo Prefecture in Japan. The Kishiro Stadium has a capacity of 20,000.

Athletics (track and field) venues in Japan
Football venues in Japan
Sports venues in Hyōgo Prefecture
Akashi, Hyōgo